Sergei Alekseyevich Borodin (born 30 January 1999) is a Russian football player who plays for Israeli Premier League club Beitar Jerusalem, on loan from Krasnodar, and the Russia national team.

Club career
He made his debut in the Russian Professional Football League for FC Krasnodar-2 on 2 September 2016 in a game against FC Dynamo Stavropol. He made his Russian Football National League debut for Krasnodar-2 on 17 July 2018 in a game against FC Sibir Novosibirsk.

On 28 August 2020, he joined FC Ufa on loan with an option to purchase. He made his Russian Premier League debut for Ufa on 17 December 2020 in a game against his main club FC Krasnodar. He substituted Bojan Jokić in the 48th minute. On 19 February 2021, Krasnodar terminated the loan early.

On 11 January 2023, Borodin was loaned by Beitar Jerusalem in Israel until 30 June 2023.

International career
Borodin was called up to the Russia national football team for the first time for a friendly against Kyrgyzstan in September 2022. He made his debut in that game on 24 September 2022.

Career statistics

References

External links
 
 

1999 births
Sportspeople from Sochi
Living people
Russian footballers
Association football defenders
Russia youth international footballers
Russia under-21 international footballers
Russia international footballers
FC Krasnodar-2 players
FC Krasnodar players
FC Ufa players
Beitar Jerusalem F.C. players
Russian Premier League players
Russian First League players
Russian Second League players
Israeli Premier League players
Russian expatriate footballers
Expatriate footballers in Israel
Russian expatriate sportspeople in Israel